Women's Super League is the highest league of women's football in England.

Women's Super League may also refer to:

Basketball
 Women's Super Basketball League, Taiwan
 Women's Super League (basketball), Ireland

Cricket
 Women's Cricket Super League, England
 Women's T20 Super League, South Africa

Floorball
 Swedish Super League (women's floorball)

Football (soccer)
 Super League Vrouwenvoetbal, Belgium
 Chinese Women's Super League
 Ecuadorian women's football championship or 
 Namibia Women's Super League
 Serbian SuperLiga (women)

Rugby League
 RFL Women's Super League, the top division of the British rugby league system
 RFL Women's Super League South, an expansion leage for southern rugby league clubs (2021 to 2023)

Volleyball
 Brazilian Women's Volleyball Super League
 Chinese Volleyball Super League
 Russian Women's Volleyball Super League
 , Spain
 Philippine Super Liga